"Them There Eyes" is a jazz song written by Maceo Pinkard, Doris Tauber, and William Tracey that was published in 1930. One of the early recorded versions was performed by Louis Armstrong in 1931. It was made famous by Billie Holiday, who recorded her version in 1939 for Vocalion Records. A version by Emile Ford & The Checkmates reached number 18 on the UK Singles Chart in 1960.

Notable versions 
 Bing Crosby (recorded November 20, 1930 as The Rhythm Boys with Gus Arnheim and his Cocoanut Grove Orchestra.) This was  popular and reached the charts of the day in 1931.
 Hal Kemp (1930)
 Louis Armstrong – recorded April 29, 1931 for Okeh Records.
 Duke Ellington (1931)
 Lester Young (1938)
 Billie Holiday (1939), (1949)
 Kay Starr (1947)
 Champ Butler (1951 and 1958, the latter as "Them There Eyes Cha-Cha")
 Varetta Dillard (1952)
 Zoot Sims (1956)
 Frank Sinatra (1956)
 Ella Fitzgerald (1957, 1963)
 Benny Goodman (1957)
 Anita O'Day (1957, 2006)
 Caterina Valente (1958)
 Natalie Wood with Frank Sinatra on his show (1958)
 Garry Moore (c. 1959)
 Emile Ford (1960)
 Peggy Lee (1961)
 Carmen McRae (1961)
 Sarah Vaughan (1961)
 Kenny Ball (1967)
 Diana Ross (1972 and 1993) – The 1972 version was on the soundtrack Lady Sings the Blues
 Barbara Cook (1980)
 Chaka Khan (1982)
 Nancy Wilson (1983)
 Joe Williams (1994)
 Oscar Peterson (1995)
 Etta Jones (2001)
 Aretha Franklin (2004)
 Nnenna Freelon (2008)
 Beth Hart and Joe Bonamassa (2013)

References 

Jazz songs
1930 songs
Songs with music by Maceo Pinkard
Carmen McRae songs
Okeh Records singles